The Gibson Futura was an electric guitar that was the precursor of the model introduced as the Explorer.  These prototypes, christened "Futura" many years later, resembled the eventual Explorer design, but had a differently-proportioned body, as well as a 'split' or 'forked' headstock that survived into the first few production Explorers but was quickly replaced. Gibson obtained  for the Futura body shape.

Original design
Gibson's designers made a very few, perhaps 4-6, of these prototypes between 1957 and early 1958, using patternmakers' mahogany at first and then korina (limba). One of these, a mockup without electronics, was photographed at the July 1957 NAMM trade show. A few prototypes were later acquired by the public.

Explorer production
When Explorer production began, with the final, wider body shape in "korina" or African limba wood, a few very early examples retained the "split-V" headstock.  One of those "transitional" models is today owned by Rick Nielsen.  The Explorer offered a radical, body design and golden-blonde korina, much like its sibling, the Flying V. Its initial run was unsuccessful and it was discontinued in 1959 after shipping fewer than 50; a few leftover bodies were fitted with nickel hardware and shipped in 1963. The Gibson Explorer was reintroduced in the 1970s and is still sold today.

Development
In 1996 Gibson brought out as a limited edition the "1957 Futura Korina Reissue," a misnomer since the unnamed initial design had never been released. Gibson's Custom Shop has occasionally produced Futuras. Epiphone added two versions of the Futura to its higher-end "Prophecy" series of guitars, with ebony black finish with matching hardware.

Corvus
Gibson marketed another model named "Futura" in the early 1980s. This Futura's body shape was nothing like the Explorer or its prototype: it was instead an upscale version of the Corvus "can-opener." Due to this fact the Corvus is commonly confused with the Futura today.

Players
 Masayuki Suzuki
 Gary Moore

Notes

References

Futura